Silvia Lloris Nicolás (born 15 May 2004) is a Spanish footballer who plays as a midfielder for Levante.

Club career
Lloris started her career at El Palmar's academy.

References

External links
Profile at La Liga

2004 births
Living people
Women's association football midfielders
Spanish women's footballers
Footballers from Murcia
Levante UD Femenino players
Primera División (women) players
Segunda Federación (women) players
Spain women's youth international footballers